Nemadus triangulum is a species in the family Leiodidae ("round fungus beetles"), in the order Coleoptera ("beetles").
It is found in North America.

References

Further reading
 Arnett, R.H. Jr., M. C. Thomas, P. E. Skelley and J. H. Frank. (eds.). (2002). American Beetles, Volume II: Polyphaga: Scarabaeoidea through Curculionoidea. CRC Press LLC, Boca Raton, FL.
 Peck, Stewart B., and Joyce Cook (2007). "Systematics, distributions, and bionomics of the Neoeocatops gen. nov. and Nemadus of North America (Coleoptera: Leiodidae: Cholevinae: Anemadini)". The Canadian Entomologist, vol. 139, no. 1, 87–117.
 Richard E. White. (1983). Peterson Field Guides: Beetles. Houghton Mifflin Company.
 Ross H. Arnett. (2000). American Insects: A Handbook of the Insects of America North of Mexico. CRC Press.

Leiodidae
Beetles described in 1936